The 1860s (pronounced "eighteen-sixties") was a decade of the Gregorian calendar that began on January 1, 1860, and ended on December 31, 1869.

The decade was noted for featuring numerous major societal shifts in the Americas. In the United States, the election of abolitionist Abraham Lincoln to the presidency in 1860 led to the secession of the southern states in the form of the Confederate States of America (CSA). The resulting American Civil War (1861-1865) would be among the first industrial wars, featuring advanced technology such as steel warships and machine guns. The victory of the Union and subsequent abolition of slavery would contribute to the decline of the global slave trade. 

In Latin America, conflict in Mexico ensued after the French Empire installed Maximilian I as Emperor of Mexico; former President Benito Juárez would regain his position in 1867 after a power struggle. The Triple Alliance of Empire of Brazil, Argentina and Uruguay in the Paraguayan War (1864-1870) would be among the bloodiest conflicts in South American history, leading to the death of almost 60% of the Paraguayan population.

The formation of the union of Austria-Hungary in 1867 and the ongoing campaign to unify Italy by Victor Emmanuel II of Sardinia-Piedmont would effect the European balance of power. The United Kingdom would continue engaging in a series of conflicts known as the New Zealand Wars with the indigenous Māori, with the New Zealand land confiscations beginning in 1863. 

In Asia, the Meiji Restoration of 1868 would begin the process of transforming Japan into a global imperial power. The Qing Dynasty of China would experience decline following its defeat to the British in 1860 in the Second Opium War. In 1864, the Russian Empire would embark upon the Circassian genocide in the Caucasus, leading to the deaths or expulsion of at least 75% of the Circassian people.

Politics and wars

Wars 
 French occupation of Mexico (1863–1867). Replacement of President of Mexico Benito Juárez (1861–1863) at first with Juan Nepomuceno Almonte (1863–1864) and then by Emperor Maximilian of Mexico (1864–1867) with the establishment of the Second Mexican Empire. Juárez eventually manages to recover his position (1867–1872).
On 18 October 1860, the first Convention of Peking formally ended the Second Opium War.
 The American Civil War lasted from 1861 to 1865.
 The Paraguayan War (1864–1870) starts in South America, with the invasion of Paraguay by the Triple Alliance (Empire of Brazil, Argentina and Uruguay). It will kill almost 60% of the country's population.
 The main phase of the New Zealand Wars between British colonials and the Māori population begins with the First Taranaki War in 1860. The most significant campaign is the Invasion of the Waikato in 1863, which sees some 14,000 British and colonial troops engaged.
 The Kingdom of Prussia under Bismarck invaded Denmark in 1864, which ended in the division of Schleswig, the location of a pro-German revolt, between Prussia and the Austrian Empire. Though Prussia and Austria had both fought side by side in this war, Prussia later attacked Austria in the Austro-Prussian war of 1866. The technological and logistical superiority of Prussia's armed forces obliterated Austria and its allies, the former also having to deal with Prussia's ally Italy in Venice. By the end of these conflicts, Prussia was seen as the most powerful state in Germany, and had total hegemony over the other German states. The NGF was formed after the Austro-Prussian war, uniting the states of north Germany, and Prussia soon led it into another conflict with France.
 The Bhutan War between the British Empire and Bhutan lasted from 1864 to 1865. It ended in a British victory and the loss of some Bhutanese territory to British India.
 The British Expedition to Abyssinia was a rescue mission and punitive expedition carried out in 1868 by the armed forces of the British Empire against the Ethiopian Empire.
 Conclusion of the Russo-Circassian War (1763–1864) resulting in Russian victory and subsequent Circassian genocide and diaspora.

Internal conflicts
The Federal War was a civil war (1859–1863) in Venezuela between the Conservative party and the Liberal party over the monopoly the Conservatives held over government positions and land ownership, and their intransigence to granting any reforms. It was the biggest and bloodiest civil war that Venezuela had since its independence. Hundreds of thousands died in the violence of the war, or from hunger or disease, in a country with a population of just over a million people
 American Civil War fought between the remaining United States of America under President Abraham Lincoln and the self-declared Confederate States of America under President Jefferson Davis (April 12, 1861 – April 9, 1865) and Vice President Alexander Stephens. Beginning of the Reconstruction era under President Andrew Johnson (1865–1869).
 1863–64 January Uprising in the Russian Empire.
 On 19 July 1864 the fall of Nanjing formally ended the 14-year Taiping Rebellion.
 1862-1877 Tongzhi Hui Revolt in Qing dynasty of China.
 1868-1869 Boshin War in Japan, fought between the Tokugawa shogunate and those seeking to return political power to the Imperial Court.

Prominent political events
 Italian Unification under King Victor Emmanuel II. Wars for expansion and national unity continue until the incorporation of the Papal States (March 17, 1861 – September 20, 1870).
 Abolition of serfdom in Russia by tsar Alexander II (1861).
Meiji Restoration in Japan (1866–1869). Tokugawa Yoshinobu, 15th and last of the Tokugawa shōguns loses control to the Meiji Emperor. A series of reforms follows. The samurai class fails to survive while the daimyōs turn to politics.
 The Dominion of Canada is created by the British North America Act on July 1, 1867.
 Compromise between Austria and Hungary, hence creating the Austro-Hungarian Empire in 1867.
 The "La Gloriosa" revolution in Spain (1868). Queen Isabella II is deposed.

Assassinations and attempts

Prominent assassinations, targeted killings, and assassination attempts include:

 President of the United States Abraham Lincoln is assassinated by John Wilkes Booth, April 14, 1865.
 King of Madagascar Radama II is captured by soldiers and strangled to death.
 Manuel Isidoro Belzu, President of Bolivia is assassinated.
 Father of Canadian Confederation, Thomas D'Arcy McGee is assassinated by Patrick J. Whelan.
 Sakamoto Ryōma, a prominent figure in the Bakumatsu era in Japan and part of the movement to overthrow the Tokugawa shogunate, is assassinated along with Nakaoka Shintarō at a Kyoto inn in 1867.

Science and technology

 The Metropolitan Railway, the world's first underground railway, opens in London in 1863.
 The First transcontinental railroad in the USA is completed in 1869.
 The Suez Canal in Egypt is opened in 1869.
 The Plongeur, the first mechanically powered submarine in the world, is launched in 1863 after three years of construction.
 Carl Wilhelm Borchardt discovers and proves Cayley's formula in graph theory in 1860.
 The first transatlantic telegraph cable is successfully laid in 1866, enabling almost instant communication between America and Europe.
 Alfred Nobel invents dynamite in Sweden, patenting it in 1867.
 James Clerk Maxwell publishes his equations that quantify the relationship between electricity and magnetism, and shows that light is a form of electromagnetic radiation
 Joseph Lister develops antiseptic methods for use in surgery in 1867, introducing carbolic acid as an antiseptic, turning it into the first widely used surgical antiseptic in surgery, and publishing Antiseptic Principle of the Practice of Surgery. As a result, deaths from infections due to surgery greatly decrease.
 Gregor Mendel formulates Mendel's laws of inheritance, the basis for genetics, in a two-part paper written in 1865 and published in 1866, although it is largely ignored until 1900.
 Dmitri Mendeleev develops the modern periodic table
 Helium was first detected during the total solar eclipse of August 18, 1868, in parts of India. It was the first eclipse expedition in which a spectroscope was used.
 J. Norman Lockyer and Pierre Janssen are honored for their discovery of the nature of the Sun's prominences. They were the first to notice bright spectral emission lines when viewing the limb of the Sun without the aid of a total solar eclipse.
 1862 International Exhibition in London, England and 1867 International Exposition in Paris.

Establishments
 The Christian Mission, later renamed The Salvation Army, is co-founded by William and Catherine Booth in London, England in 1865.
 The London Fire Brigade was established in 1865.
 Florence Nightingale founds school for nurses in 1860.
 Purdue University in West Lafayette, Indiana, USA opens its doors on May 6, 1869, for the first time under a land grant from the Morrill Act.

Popular culture

Religion 
 In Catholicism, reaction against higher criticism and the liberal movement in Europe
 The Seventh-day Adventist Church becomes officially established in 1863 in Battle Creek, Michigan.
 Bahá'u'lláh declares his station as "the One whom God shall make Manifest", in the Garden of Ridván, as foretold by the Báb. Baháʼís see this as the beginning date of the Baháʼí Faith.

Literature and arts
 Victor Hugo publishes Les Misérables.
 Leo Tolstoy publishes War and Peace.
 Fyodor Dostoevsky publishes Crime and Punishment.
 Lewis Carroll publishes Alice's Adventures in Wonderland.
 Jules Verne publishes Twenty Thousand Leagues Under the Sea.
 Impressionism went public.
 Charles Dickens publishes Great Expectations and Our Mutual Friend.
 George Eliot publishes the Silas Marner.
 Karl Marx publishes Das Kapital.
 Horatio Alger publishes "Ragged Dick".
 Winged Victory of Samothrace is discovered, 1863.

Sports
 The first college football game is played in 1869, with Rutgers beating Princeton 6–4. 
 The sport of skiing is invented around 1862.
 The Football Association is formed in the United Kingdom of Great Britain and Ireland, paving the way for association football to become the world's predominant spectator sport.
 The Cincinnati Redstockings became the first openly professional baseball team in 1869. They finished the same season with a perfect 58–0 record, thanks in large part to their Hall of Fame leader Harry Wright.

Fashion

 The Victorian era and its culture largely thrived from 1860 until 1901.
 The culture of the Victorian era comes to America and remains in place until around the turn of the 20th century, where the year it ends is disputed as to whether it ended with the rise of progressivism in 1896 or with the death of Queen Victoria in 1901.

Miscellaneous trends
 The start of the bicycle craze of 1860–1900

People

Politics
 Louis Curchod, Director International Telecommunication Union

Famous and infamous personalities
 John Wilkes Booth, the assassin of president Abraham Lincoln
 Kit Carson, Wild West, frontiersman, mountain man
 Thomas C. Durant, Wild West, railroad tycoon
 Wild Bill Hickok, Wild West, lawman.

References

Further reading
 Appleton's Annual Cyclopaedia and Register of Important Events: 1861 (1864)   online
 
  Appletons' annual cyclopedia and register of important events: Embracing political, military, and ecclesiastical affairs; public documents; biography, statistics, commerce, finance, literature, science, agriculture, and mechanical industry, Volume 3 1863 (1864), thorough coverage of the events of 1863
  The American Annual Cyclopedia and Register of Important Events of the Year 1867
 American Annual Cyclopedia ... 1868 (1869), online 
 American Annual Cyclopedia ... for 1869 (1870) online edition

External links

 1860s in fashion – Clothing, Hair Styles and Personal Appearance.

 
1860s decade overviews